The Khuzam Palace is a major palace and museum in Jeddah, Saudi Arabia. It houses the Jeddah Regional Museum of Archaeology and Ethnography.

History and the building
The Museum is in the historic Khuzam Palace in the Al-Nuzlah al-Yamaniyah quarter in the south of Jeddah. The building was constructed as a royal palace from 1928 to 1932 under the supervision of Muhammed bin Laden. The oil agreement with the Standard Oil Company of California was signed by Abdullah Suleiman on behalf of Saudi Arabia and Lloyd N. Hamilton on behalf of the company in Khuzam Palace, Jeddah, in 1933.

Dar Al-Arkan Real Estate (DAAR) have been commissioned to develop the area on 11 October 2008 by the Custodian of the Two Holy Mosques.

The exhibitions
The collection ranges from artefacts of the Stone Age attributed to the Acheulean period found in nearby Wadi Fatimah over items of several pre-Islamic cultures and items illustrating the rise of Islam to relicts from the time the palace was used by the royal family. A second collection holds ethnographic items portraying the recent culture of the region.

See also
 List of museums in Saudi Arabia

References

External links
 

1932 establishments in Saudi Arabia
Buildings and structures completed in 1932
Museums with year of establishment missing
Buildings and structures in Jeddah
Museums in Jeddah
Archaeological museums
Ethnographic museums in Asia
History museums in Saudi Arabia
Palaces in Saudi Arabia
Royal residences in Saudi Arabia